Evangelos Skotidas (born 1895) was a Greek épée and sabre fencer. He competed at the 1920 and 1924 Summer Olympics.

References

1895 births
Year of death missing
Greek male épée fencers
Olympic fencers of Greece
Fencers at the 1920 Summer Olympics
Fencers at the 1924 Summer Olympics
Sportspeople from Athens
Greek male sabre fencers